Indium is a chemical element with the symbol In and atomic number 49. Indium is the softest metal that is not an alkali metal. It is a silvery-white metal that resembles tin in appearance. It is a post-transition metal that makes up 0.21 parts per million of the Earth's crust. Indium has a melting point higher than sodium and gallium, but lower than lithium and tin. Chemically, indium is similar to gallium and thallium, and it is largely intermediate between the two in terms of its properties. Indium was discovered in 1863 by Ferdinand Reich and Hieronymous Theodor Richter by spectroscopic methods. They named it for the indigo blue line in its spectrum. Indium was isolated the next year.

Indium is a minor component in zinc sulfide ores and is produced as a byproduct of zinc refinement. It is most notably used in the semiconductor industry, in low-melting-point metal alloys such as solders, in soft-metal high-vacuum seals, and in the production of transparent conductive coatings of indium tin oxide (ITO) on glass. Indium is considered a technology-critical element.

Indium has no biological role. Its compounds are toxic when injected into the bloodstream. Most occupational exposure is through ingestion, from which indium compounds are not absorbed well, and inhalation, from which they are moderately absorbed.

Properties

Physical

Indium is a silvery-white, highly ductile post-transition metal with a bright luster. It is so soft (Mohs hardness 1.2) that like sodium, it can be cut with a knife. It also leaves a visible line on paper. It is a member of group 13 on the periodic table and its properties are mostly intermediate between its vertical neighbours gallium and thallium. Like tin, a high-pitched cry is heard when indium is bent – a crackling sound due to crystal twinning. Like gallium, indium is able to wet glass. Like both, indium has a low melting point, 156.60 °C (313.88 °F); higher than its lighter homologue, gallium, but lower than its heavier homologue, thallium, and lower than tin. The boiling point is 2072 °C (3762 °F), higher than that of thallium, but lower than gallium, conversely to the general trend of melting points, but similarly to the trends down the other post-transition metal groups because of the weakness of the metallic bonding with few electrons delocalized.

The density of indium, 7.31 g/cm3, is also greater than gallium, but lower than thallium. Below the critical temperature, 3.41 K, indium becomes a superconductor. Indium crystallizes in the body-centered tetragonal crystal system in the space group I4/mmm (lattice parameters: a = 325 pm, c = 495 pm): this is a slightly distorted face-centered cubic structure, where each indium atom has four neighbours at 324 pm distance and eight neighbours slightly further (336 pm). Indium has greater solubility in liquid mercury than any other metal (more than 50 mass percent of indium at 0 °C). Indium displays a ductile viscoplastic response, found to be size-independent in tension and compression. However it does have a size effect in bending and indentation, associated to a length-scale of order 50–100 µm, significantly large when compared with other metals.

Chemical
Indium has 49 electrons, with an electronic configuration of [Kr]4d105s25p1. In compounds, indium most commonly donates the three outermost electrons to become indium(III), In3+. In some cases, the pair of 5s-electrons are not donated, resulting in indium(I), In+. The stabilization of the monovalent state is attributed to the inert pair effect, in which relativistic effects stabilize the 5s-orbital, observed in heavier elements. Thallium (indium's heavier homolog) shows an even stronger effect, causing oxidation to thallium(I) to be more probable than to thallium(III), whereas gallium (indium's lighter homolog) commonly shows only the +3 oxidation state. Thus, although thallium(III) is a moderately strong oxidizing agent, indium(III) is not, and many indium(I) compounds are powerful reducing agents. While the energy required to include the s-electrons in chemical bonding is lowest for indium among the group 13 metals, bond energies decrease down the group so that by indium, the energy released in forming two additional bonds and attaining the +3 state is not always enough to outweigh the energy needed to involve the 5s-electrons. Indium(I) oxide and hydroxide are more basic and indium(III) oxide and hydroxide are more acidic.

A number of standard electrode potentials, depending on the reaction under study, are reported for indium, reflecting the decreased stability of the +3 oxidation state:
{|
|-
| In2+ + e−|| ⇌ In+ || E0 = −0.40 V
|-
| In3+ + e−|| ⇌ In2+ || E0 = −0.49 V
|-
| In3+ + 2 e−|| ⇌ In+ || E0 = −0.443 V
|-
| In3+ + 3 e−|| ⇌ In || E0 = −0.3382 V
|-
| In+ + e−|| ⇌ In || E0 = −0.14 V
|}

Indium metal does not react with water, but it is oxidized by stronger oxidizing agents such as halogens to give indium(III) compounds. It does not form a boride, silicide, or carbide, and the hydride InH3 has at best a transitory existence in ethereal solutions at low temperatures, being unstable enough to spontaneously polymerize without coordination. Indium is rather basic in aqueous solution, showing only slight amphoteric characteristics, and unlike its lighter homologs aluminium and gallium, it is insoluble in aqueous alkaline solutions.

Isotopes

Indium has 39 known isotopes, ranging in mass number from 97 to 135. Only two isotopes occur naturally as primordial nuclides: indium-113, the only stable isotope, and indium-115, which has a half-life of 4.41 years, four orders of magnitude greater than the age of the Universe and nearly 30,000 times greater than that of natural thorium. The half-life of 115In is very long because the beta decay to 115Sn is spin-forbidden. Indium-115 makes up 95.7% of all indium. Indium is one of three known elements (the others being tellurium and rhenium) of which the stable isotope is less abundant in nature than the long-lived primordial radioisotopes.

The stablest artificial isotope is indium-111, with a half-life of approximately 2.8 days. All other isotopes have half-lives shorter than 5 hours. Indium also has 47 meta states, among which indium-114m1 (half-life about 49.51 days) is the most stable, more stable than the ground state of any indium isotope other than the primordial. All decay by isomeric transition. The indium isotopes lighter than 115In predominantly decay through electron capture or positron emission to form cadmium isotopes, while the other indium isotopes from 115In and greater predominantly decay through beta-minus decay to form tin isotopes.

Compounds

Indium(III)

Indium(III) oxide, In2O3, forms when indium metal is burned in air or when the hydroxide or nitrate is heated. In2O3 adopts a structure like alumina and is amphoteric, that is able to react with both acids and bases. Indium reacts with water to reproduce soluble indium(III) hydroxide, which is also amphoteric; with alkalis to produce indates(III); and with acids to produce indium(III) salts:

In(OH)3 + 3 HCl → InCl3 + 3 H2O

The analogous sesquichalcogenides with sulfur, selenium, and tellurium are also known. Indium forms the expected trihalides. Chlorination, bromination, and iodination of In produce colorless InCl3, InBr3, and yellow InI3. The compounds are Lewis acids, somewhat akin to the better known aluminium trihalides. Again like the related aluminium compound, InF3 is polymeric.

Direct reaction of indium with the pnictogens produces the gray or semimetallic III–V semiconductors. Many of them slowly decompose in moist air, necessitating careful storage of semiconductor compounds to prevent contact with the atmosphere. Indium nitride is readily attacked by acids and alkalis.

Indium(I)
Indium(I) compounds are not common. The chloride, bromide, and iodide are deeply colored, unlike the parent trihalides from which they are prepared. The fluoride is known only as an unstable gaseous compound. Indium(I) oxide black powder is produced when indium(III) oxide decomposes upon heating to 700 °C.

Other oxidation states
Less frequently, indium forms compounds in oxidation state +2 and even fractional oxidation states. Usually such materials feature In–In bonding, most notably in the halides In2X4 and [In2X6]2−, and various subchalcogenides such as In4Se3. Several other compounds are known to combine indium(I) and indium(III), such as InI6(InIIICl6)Cl3, InI5(InIIIBr4)2(InIIIBr6), and InIInIIIBr4.

Organoindium compounds
Organoindium compounds feature In–C bonds. Most are In(III) derivatives, but cyclopentadienylindium(I) is an exception. It was the first known organoindium(I) compound, and is polymeric, consisting of zigzag chains of alternating indium atoms and cyclopentadienyl complexes. Perhaps the best-known organoindium compound is trimethylindium, In(CH3)3, used to prepare certain semiconducting materials.

History
In 1863, the German chemists Ferdinand Reich and Hieronymous Theodor Richter were testing ores from the mines around Freiberg, Saxony. They dissolved the minerals pyrite, arsenopyrite, galena and sphalerite in hydrochloric acid and distilled raw zinc chloride. Reich, who was color-blind, employed Richter as an assistant for detecting the colored spectral lines. Knowing that ores from that region sometimes contain thallium, they searched for the green thallium emission spectrum lines. Instead, they found a bright blue line. Because that blue line did not match any known element, they hypothesized a new element was present in the minerals. They named the element indium, from the indigo color seen in its spectrum, after the Latin indicum, meaning 'of India'.

Richter went on to isolate the metal in 1864. Reich and Richter later fell out when the latter claimed to be the sole discoverer.

Occurrence

Indium is created by the long-lasting (up to thousands of years) s-process (slow neutron capture) in low-to-medium-mass stars (range in mass between 0.6 and 10 solar masses). When a silver-109 atom captures a neutron, it transmutes into silver-110, which then undergoes beta decay to become cadmium-110. Capturing further neutrons, it becomes cadmium-115, which decays to indium-115 by another beta decay. This explains why the radioactive isotope is more abundant than the stable one. The stable indium isotope, indium-113, is one of the p-nuclei, the origin of which is not fully understood; although indium-113 is known to be made directly in the s- and r-processes (rapid neutron capture), and also as the daughter of very long-lived cadmium-113, which has a half-life of about eight quadrillion years, this cannot account for all indium-113.

Indium is the 68th most abundant element in Earth's crust at approximately 50 ppb. This is similar to the crustal abundance of silver, bismuth and mercury. It very rarely forms its own minerals, or occurs in elemental form. Fewer than 10 indium minerals such as roquesite (CuInS2) are known, and none occur at sufficient concentrations for economic extraction. Instead, indium is usually a trace constituent of more common ore minerals, such as sphalerite and chalcopyrite. From these, it can be extracted as a by-product during smelting. While the enrichment of indium in these deposits is high relative to its crustal abundance, it is insufficient, at current prices, to support extraction of indium as the main product.

Different estimates exist of the amounts of indium contained within the ores of other metals. However, these amounts are not extractable without mining of the host materials (see Production and availability). Thus, the availability of indium is fundamentally determined by the rate at which these ores are extracted, and not their absolute amount. This is an aspect that is often forgotten in the current debate, e.g. by the Graedel group at Yale in their criticality assessments, explaining the paradoxically low depletion times some studies cite.

Production and availability

Indium is produced exclusively as a by-product during the processing of the ores of other metals. Its main source material are sulfidic zinc ores, where it is mostly hosted by sphalerite. Minor amounts are probably also extracted from sulfidic copper ores. During the roast-leach-electrowinning process of zinc smelting, indium accumulates in the iron-rich residues. From these, it can be extracted in different ways. It may also be recovered directly from the process solutions. Further purification is done by electrolysis. The exact process varies with the mode of operation of the smelter.

Its by-product status means that indium production is constrained by the amount of sulfidic zinc (and copper) ores extracted each year. Therefore, its availability needs to be discussed in terms of supply potential. The supply potential of a by-product is defined as that amount which is economically extractable from its host materials per year under current market conditions (i.e. technology and price). Reserves and resources are not relevant for by-products, since they cannot be extracted independently from the main-products. Recent estimates put the supply potential of indium at a minimum of 1,300 t/yr from sulfidic zinc ores and 20 t/yr from sulfidic copper ores. These figures are significantly greater than current production (655 t in 2016). Thus, major future increases in the by-product production of indium will be possible without significant increases in production costs or price. The average indium price in 2016 was 240/kg, down from 705/kg in 2014.

China is a leading producer of indium (290 tonnes in 2016), followed by South Korea (195 t), Japan (70 t) and Canada (65 t). The Teck Resources refinery in Trail, British Columbia, is a large single-source indium producer, with an output of 32.5 tonnes in 2005, 41.8 tonnes in 2004 and 36.1 tonnes in 2003.

The primary consumption of indium worldwide is LCD production. Demand rose rapidly from the late 1990s to 2010 with the popularity of LCD computer monitors and television sets, which now account for 50% of indium consumption. Increased manufacturing efficiency and recycling (especially in Japan) maintain a balance between demand and supply. According to the UNEP, indium's end-of-life recycling rate is less than 1%.

Applications

In 1924, indium was found to have a valued property of stabilizing non-ferrous metals, and that became the first significant use for the element. The first large-scale application for indium was coating bearings in high-performance aircraft engines during World War II, to protect against damage and corrosion; this is no longer a major use of the element. New uses were found in fusible alloys, solders, and electronics. In the 1950s, tiny beads of indium were used for the emitters and collectors of PNP alloy-junction transistors. In the middle and late 1980s, the development of indium phosphide semiconductors and indium tin oxide thin films for liquid-crystal displays (LCD) aroused much interest. By 1992, the thin-film application had become the largest end use.

Indium(III) oxide and indium tin oxide (ITO) are used as a transparent conductive coating on glass substrates in electroluminescent panels. Indium tin oxide is used as a light filter in low-pressure sodium-vapor lamps. The infrared radiation is reflected back into the lamp, which increases the temperature within the tube and improves the performance of the lamp.

Indium has many semiconductor-related applications. Some indium compounds, such as indium antimonide and indium phosphide, are semiconductors with useful properties: one precursor is usually trimethylindium (TMI), which is also used as the semiconductor dopant in II–VI compound semiconductors. InAs and InSb are used for low-temperature transistors and InP for high-temperature transistors. The compound semiconductors InGaN and InGaP are used in light-emitting diodes (LEDs) and laser diodes. Indium is used in photovoltaics as the semiconductor copper indium gallium selenide (CIGS), also called CIGS solar cells, a type of second-generation thin-film solar cell. Indium is used in PNP bipolar junction transistors with germanium: when soldered at low temperature, indium does not stress the germanium.

Indium wire is used as a vacuum seal and a thermal conductor in cryogenics and ultra-high-vacuum applications, in such manufacturing applications as gaskets that deform to fill gaps. Owing to its great plasticity and adhesion to metals, Indium sheets are sometimes used for cold-soldering in microwave circuits and waveguide joints, where direct soldering is complicated. Indium is an ingredient in the gallium–indium–tin alloy galinstan, which is liquid at room temperature and replaces mercury in some thermometers. Other alloys of indium with bismuth, cadmium, lead, and tin, which have higher but still low melting points (between 50 and 100 °C), are used in fire sprinkler systems and heat regulators.

Indium is one of many substitutes for mercury in alkaline batteries to prevent the zinc from corroding and releasing hydrogen gas. Indium is added to some dental amalgam alloys to decrease the surface tension of the mercury and allow for less mercury and easier amalgamation.

Indium's high neutron-capture cross-section for thermal neutrons makes it suitable for use in control rods for nuclear reactors, typically in an alloy of 80% silver, 15% indium, and 5% cadmium. In nuclear engineering, the (n,n') reactions of 113In and 115In are used to determine magnitudes of neutron fluxes.

In 2009, Professor Mas Subramanian and associates at Oregon State University discovered that indium can be combined with yttrium and manganese to form an intensely blue, non-toxic, inert, fade-resistant pigment, YInMn blue, the first new inorganic blue pigment discovered in 200 years.

Biological role and precautions

Indium has no metabolic role in any organism. In a similar way to aluminium salts, indium(III) ions can be toxic to the kidney when given by injection. Indium tin oxide and indium phosphide harm the pulmonary and immune systems, predominantly through ionic indium, though hydrated indium oxide is more than forty times as toxic when injected, measured by the quantity of indium introduced. Radioactive indium-111 (in very small amounts on a chemical basis) is used in nuclear medicine tests, as a radiotracer to follow the movement of labeled proteins and white blood cells in the body. Indium compounds are mostly not absorbed upon ingestion and are only moderately absorbed on inhalation; they tend to be stored temporarily in the muscles, skin, and bones before being excreted, and the biological half-life of indium is about two weeks in humans.

People can be exposed to indium in the workplace by inhalation, ingestion, skin contact, and eye contact. Indium lung is a lung disease characterized by pulmonary alveolar proteinosis and pulmonary fibrosis, first described by Japanese researchers in 2003. , 10 cases had been described, though more than 100 indium workers had documented respiratory abnormalities. The National Institute for Occupational Safety and Health has set a recommended exposure limit (REL) of 0.1 mg/m3 over an eight-hour workday.

See also

References

Sources

External links
 Indium at The Periodic Table of Videos (University of Nottingham)
 Reducing Agents > Indium low valent
 NIOSH Pocket Guide to Chemical Hazards (Centers for Disease Control and Prevention)

 
Chemical elements
Post-transition metals
Native element minerals
Chemical elements with body-centered tetragonal structure